Rogue Moon of Spinstorme is a 1981 role-playing game adventure published by Judges Guild for Traveller.

Plot summary
Rogue Moon of Spinstorme is a follow-up adventure to Amycus Probe that takes the crew of the vessel Hrunta to the Spinstorm system in search of the builders of the alien base discovered in Amycus Probe.

Publication history
Rogue Moon of Spinstorme was written by Dave Sering and was published in 1981 by Judges Guild as a 32-page book.

Reception
William A. Barton reviewed Rogue Moon of Spinstorme in The Space Gamer No. 48. Barton commented that "Overall, if you have Amycus Probe, you'll probably want to go with this one, too. As a stand-alone, Rogue Moon of Spinstorm is too much in the mold of past 'investigate alien installation' scenarios to be worth most refs' time and money."

Michael Stackpole reviewed Rogue Moon of Spinstorm in The Space Gamer No. 50. Stackpole commented that "Dave Sering does a fine job with the writing and general design. The mystery aspect of this adventure, however, is horrible. There are seven clues scattered around the two bases and battle raft presented for exploration. None of the clues are usable by the players. All clues have to be presented to the authorities for analysis."

References

Judges Guild publications
Role-playing game supplements introduced in 1981
Traveller (role-playing game) adventures